The Vietnam national badminton team represents Vietnam in international badminton team competitions. The national team is controlled by the Vietnam Badminton Federation, the governing body for badminton in Vietnam. The Vietnamese team competes in the biannual Southeast Asian Games and have made several achievements in badminton at the games.

History 
The Vietnamese badminton team was formed following the establishment of the Vietnam Badminton Federation in 1958. The team have never qualified for the Thomas Cup and Uber Cup. Nguyễn Tiến Minh won Vietnam's first World Championship medal at the 2013 BWF World Championships.

Men's team 
The Vietnamese men's team first competed in the 1995 Southeast Asian Games. The team have lost in the quarterfinals until 2005 when the team defeat Singapore 3–2 to enter the semifinals for a guaranteed bronze. The team won when scratch pair Nguyễn Quang Minh and Nguyễn Hoàng Hải defeat Khoo Kian Teck and Alvin Fu to deliver the winning point for Vietnam.

Women's team 
The Vietnamese women's team debuted at the 1995 Southeast Asian Games. The team then reached the semi-finals at the 1999 Southeast Asian Games but lost to Indonesia 0–5. They reached the semifinals again in 2001 but lost to Thailand 0–3. At the 2003 Southeast Asian Games, the women's team reached their third consecutive semifinal by beating the Philippines 3–2 in the quarter-finals.

In 2018, the Vietnamese women's team made their first appearance at the Badminton Asia Team Championships. The team lost to Thailand and Malaysia but won against the Philippines in the group stage. In 2021, the Vietnamese women's team made history by beating Malaysia for the first time to enter the semifinals at the 2021 Southeast Asian Games.

Mixed team 
The Vietnamese mixed team made their debut in the 2011 Sudirman Cup. The team were drawn to classification Group 3B and won all their matches against Bulgaria and South Africa but lost to Sweden to finish in 23rd place. In 2017, the team debuted at the Badminton Asia Mixed Team Championships as host nation. They were eliminated in the group stages. In that same year, the team participated in the 2017 Sudirman Cup. They were drawn into classification Group 2A with Scotland, New Zealand and Canada. The team reached a new high when they topped their group and defeated Singapore 3–1 to finish in 13th place.

Participation in BWF competitions

Sudirman Cup

Asian Team Championships

SEA Games

Junior competitive record

Asian Junior Team Championships

ASEAN School Games

Staff 
The following list shows the coaching staff for the national badminton team of Vietnam.

Players

Current squad

Men's team

Women's team

Previous squads 

 Sudirman Cup (2015, 2017, 2019)

References 

Badminton
National badminton teams
Badminton in Vietnam